Vladimir Stoyanov Savov (born 19 August 1928) is a Bulgarian former basketball player. He competed in the men's tournament at the 1952 Summer Olympics, and the 1956 Summer Olympics.

References

External links
 

1928 births
Possibly living people
Bulgarian men's basketball players
Olympic basketball players of Bulgaria
Basketball players at the 1952 Summer Olympics
Basketball players at the 1956 Summer Olympics
Place of birth missing (living people)